Saint-Vulbas is a commune in the Ain department in eastern France.

Population

Geography 
The town is located on the right bank of the Rhône , 205 meters above sea level, 35 kilometers northeast of Lyon , 13 kilometers from Ambérieu-en-Bugey . On its territory is the Bugey nuclear power plant as well as the Plaine de l'Ain industrial park .

The town is located in the small region of the Ain plain , between Bas-Bugey and Côtière .

See also
Communes of the Ain department

References

Communes of Ain
Ain communes articles needing translation from French Wikipedia